Launch Complex 25 (LC-25) was a four-pad launch site at Cape Canaveral Space Force Station, Florida built for test flights of the US Navy's submarine-launched ballistic missiles Polaris, Poseidon and Trident from 1958–1979.

Pads 25A and 25B were built in 1957.  Pads 25C and 25D were added in May 1968 for the larger Poseidon.  The blockhouse eventually served all four pads. It was extensively reinforced when the Poseidon pads, 25C and 25D, were added.

Pad 25B was initially built with an underground launch mechanism known as a ship motion simulator to simulate the roll and pitch of a submarine. It was first used August 14, 1959 and was mothballed in October 1961.

The launch complex was  dismantled in 1979.

In November 2012, ground was broken for a new $185-million Navy missile test facility to be built over the underground structures at LC-25 and LC-29 called the  Strategic Weapon System Ashore.  The facility will allow the testing of fire control, launch systems and navigation for submarine-fired missiles to be conducted at one facility instead of being done by contractors in different locations around the country.

Launch history

Polaris FTV: 19 launches  (April 18, 1958–October 2, 1959)
Polaris A-1: 16 launches  (March 9, 1960–December 5, 1961)
Polaris A-2: 14 launches  (November 10, 1960–March 5, 1965)
Polaris A-3:  11 launches  (February 11, 1963–July 3, 1964)
Poseidon: 16 launches  (August 16, 1968–June 29, 1970)
Trident I: 18 launches  (January 18, 1977–January 22, 1979)

Notes

References
"Launch Complex 25" Air Force Space & Missile Museum  Retrieved June 20, 2011.
Moody, Norman "Cape's Navy Missile Site Will Expand" (November 8, 2012) Florida Today Retrieved November 8, 2012

Cape Canaveral Space Force Station